Mr. Bojangles may refer to:

 Bill Robinson (1877–1949), American dancer and actor, known as "Bojangles"
 "Mr. Bojangles", a 1968 song by Jerry Jeff Walker
 "Mr. Bojangles", an unnamed suspect in the West Memphis Three murder case
 A movement in Philip Glass's opera Einstein on the Beach
 Mr. Bojangles (album), a 1973 album by Sonny Stitt

See also
 Bojangles (disambiguation)